A semi-acoustic guitar, hollow-body electric, or thinline  is a type of electric guitar with a sound box and at least one electric pickup designed to be played with amplification.  First created in the 1930s, it is different from an acoustic-electric guitar, which is an acoustic guitar that has pickups or other means of amplification added by either the manufacturer or the player.

History
In the 1930s, guitar manufacturers aimed at increasing the sound level produced by the instrument, to compete with louder instruments such as the drums. Companies such as Gibson, Rickenbacker and Gretsch focused on amplifying a guitar through a loudspeaker. In 1936, Gibson introduced their first manufactured semi-acoustic guitars, the ES-150s (Electric Spanish Series).

Gibson based them on a standard production archtop, with f holes on the face of the guitar's soundbox. This model resembled traditional jazz guitars that were popular at the time. The soundbox on the guitar let limited sound emit from the hollow body of the guitar.  The ES-150s could be electrically amplified via a Charlie Christian pickup, a magnetic single-coil pickup that converted the energy of the vibrating strings into an electrical signal. The clear sound of the pickups made the ES series popular with jazz musicians.

The ES-150 was made several years after Rickenbacker made the first solid-body electric guitar. The ES series was designed as an experiment for Gibson to test the potential success of electric guitars. Due to its financial success, the ES series is often referred to as the first successful electric guitar. The ES-150 was followed by the ES-250 a year later, in what became a long line of semi acoustics for the Gibson company.

In 1949 Gibson released two new models: the ES-175 and ES-5. The ES-175 and ES-5 models were the first to come with built-in electric pickups and are widely considered the first fully electric semi-acoustic guitars.  Several models, including the ES-350T by Gibson, were made in the 1950s to accommodate a demand for a comfortable and modern version of the original archtop model.

In 1958, Gibson first manufactured a 'semi-hollow body guitar' that featured a block of solid wood between the front and back sections of the guitars' cutaway.  The guitar had a smaller resonant cavity inside, which makes less sound emit from the f holes.

Rickenbacker also began making semi-acoustic guitars in 1958.  German guitar crafter, Roger Rossmiesl developed the 300 series for Rickenbacker. The series was a wide semi-acoustic that used a sleeker dash hole on one side of the guitar, with a pick guard on the other side, rather than a traditional f hole.

In addition to the main model variants of the guitar, Gibson made several small changes to the guitar, including a laminated top for the ES-175 model and mounted top pickups for general use on all their models. While Gibson provided many of the innovations in semi-acoustic guitars from the 1930s to the 1950s, there were also various makes by other companies including a hollow archtop by Gretsch. The 6120 model by Gretsch became very popular as a rockabilly model despite having almost no technical differences from Gibson models. Rickenbacker was also a prominent maker of the semi-hollow body guitar. Gibson, Gretsch, Rickenbacker, and other companies still make semi-acoustic and semi-hollow body guitars.

Usage
The semi-acoustic and semi-hollow body guitars were used widely by jazz musicians in the 1930s. The guitar became used in pop, folk, and blues. The guitars sometimes produced feedback when played through an amplifier at a loud level so they were unpopular for bands that had to play loud enough to perform in large venues. As rock became more experimental in the late 60s and 70s, the guitar became more popular because players learned to use its feedback issues creatively; One example is Ted Nugent, who primarily plays the semi-acoustic Gibson Byrdland.

Semi-hollow guitars share some of the tonal characteristics of hollow guitars, such as their praised warmth and clean tone. However, the addition of the central block helps to manage feedback and allows the guitar to be played normally at higher gain and higher volume.  Semi-hollow guitars with a central block are also more durable than fully hollow guitars, whose sound is particularly popular with jazz, blues, rockabilly and psychobilly guitarists.

Today, semi-acoustic and semi-hollow body guitars are still popular among many artists across various genres. Examples include Dan Auerbach of The Black Keys, renowned jazz guitarist George Benson, John Scofield, multi-instrumentalist Paul McCartney and former Guns N' Roses member Izzy Stradlin. Famous guitarists of the past who have used semi acoustic guitars include John Lennon of the Beatles and B.B. King, both of whom have had signature semi-acoustic models released. Semi-acoustic guitars have also been valued as practice guitars because, when played "unplugged," they are quieter than full acoustic guitars, but more audible than solid-body electric guitars because of their open cavity. They are also popular because the cavities reduce the weight of the guitar.

With most solid-body guitars, the electronics are accessed, repaired, or replaced by removing either the pick guard or an access panel on the back of the guitar's body. In a semi-acoustic guitar, where there is no solid body to create a chamber to house the electronics, these components are pushed or pulled through the lower f-hole of the guitar's body.

Variations
Other semi-acoustic instruments include basses and mandolins. These are similarly constructed to semi-acoustic guitars, and are used in the same ways and with the same limitations.

Some semi-acoustic models have a fully hollow body (for instance the Gibson ES-175 and Epiphone Casino), others may have a solid center block running the length and depth of the body, called semi hollow body (for instance the Gibson ES-335).

Other guitars are borderline between semi-acoustic and solid body. For example, some guitars have chambers built into an otherwise solid body to enrich the sound. This type of instrument can be referred to as a semi-hollow  or a chambered body guitar. Players disagree on exactly where to draw the line between a constructed sound box and a solid wooden body (whose construction also affects the sound according to many players). Any of the following can be called semi-acoustic:
 Instruments that start from a solid body blank that has been routed out to make a chambered body guitar, such as the Fender Telecaster Thinline
 Instruments with semi-hollow bodies constructed from plates of wood around a solid core, with no soundholes, such as the Gibson Lucille or Brian May Red Special
 Instruments with a solid core but hollow bouts and soundholes (usually f-holes), such as the Gibson ES-335. In these, the bridge is fixed to a solid block of wood rather than to a sounding board, and the belly vibration is minimised much as in a solid body instrument
 Thin-bodied archtop guitars, such as the Epiphone Casino, that have a sounding board and sound box, but purely to modify the sound transmitted to the pickups—still intended as purely electric instruments because of their weak acoustic sound
 Full hollowbody semi-acoustic instruments, often called Jazz guitars, such as the Gibson ES-175; these have a full-size sound box, but are still intended to be played through an amplifier.

Sound Hole Variations:

 Many hollow body guitars, both semi and full have Cat-Eyed or Cat Eye sound holes which are shaped like the eye of a cat instead of the traditional F Holes.

Gallery

Examples

Some companies that have produced famous semi-acoustic guitars include: Gibson, Gretsch R M Olson and Rickenbacker. A variety of manufacturers now produce semi-acoustic model guitars: D'Angelico, Epiphone, Ibanez, etc.
Fully hollow body
 Gibson L-5
 Gibson ES-175
 Epiphone Joe Pass Emperor II
 Hofner 500/1
Thinline hollow body (thin body)
 Epiphone Casino / Gibson ES-330
 Gretsch White Falcon
Semi hollow body (with center block)
 Gibson ES-335 / Epiphone Dot
 Gibson ES-339
 Duesenberg Guitars Fullerton Series
 D'Angelico EX-DC
Semi hollow body (with center block, but no soundholes)
 Gibson Lucille
Semi hollow body (solid-body with cavities)
 Rickenbacker 330
 Fender Telecaster Thinline
 Guild Bluesbird
 Gretsch Penguin
 RM Oldon Ollandoc
Semi hollow body (solid body with cavities, but no soundholes)
 Brian May Red Special
various types
 Archtop guitars. Guitars with a fully hollow or semi-hollow body, with or without pickups.
 Electro-acoustic guitars. Fully acoustic guitars with piezo pickups.
 Hybrid guitars.  Guitars with both magnetic and piezo pickups. Can be solid, semi-hollow or hollow bodied.
 Silent guitars. Solid body guitars with a piezo pickups.-->

References

Amplified instruments
Guitars
String instrument construction